Concord University (Concord) is a public university in Athens, West Virginia. It was founded on February 28, 1872, when the West Virginia Legislature passed "an Act to locate a Branch State Normal School, in the town of Concord Church, in the County of Mercer". This normal school was founded by veterans of both the Union and the Confederacy, Concord is named for the ideal of "harmony and sweet fellowship".

It is known for its picturesque campus which has been dubbed "The Campus Beautiful" and its scenic location on a knoll overlooking the mountains in the area. The university also operates a center and conducts classes in Beckley, West Virginia.

History
Year — Selected events
1872 — West Virginia State Legislature establishes the name of Concord for the new school
1875 — Classes start with 70 students
1887 — State funds provide for a new brick building on the site of the present Athens Middle School
1896 — Another post office in Concord, Hampshire County, West Virginia was called "Concord;" therefore, the town's name is changed to "Athens" after the Greek city and a center of learning
1910 — Fire destroys the original brick building and the campus is moved to its present site
1912 — A new building was erected, called Old Main, which is currently known as Marsh Hall
1918 — Start of expansion with new residence halls, gymnasium, as well as academic programs
1931 — Name changed to "Concord State Teachers College"
1943 — Name changed to "Concord College" and the United States Army Air Corps 15th College Training Detachment uses the campus
1945 — Start of postwar enrollment growth and expansion of the physical plant, including a new Science Building
1959 – Expansion of campus continues (College Center, student, and faculty housing) as well as of the curriculum emphasizing quality and a cosmopolitan faculty
1973 – West Virginia Board of Regents and the State Legislature propose to merge Concord and Bluefield State Colleges
1976 – The administrative merger is abandoned and Concord's enrollment increases with new academic programs
2004 – Name changed to "Concord University"

Academics
Concord offers numerous undergraduate programs in 11 emphasis areas and 6 graduate programs: Master of Education, Master of Social Work, Master of Arts in Health Promotion, Master of Arts in Teaching, Master of Athletic Training, and Master of Business Administration.

Colleges and departments
The university is organized into three units.

College of Professional and Liberal Studies
Department of Business
Department of Education
Department of Fine Arts and Communication
Department of Humanities
Department of Social Work and Sociology
College of Science, Mathematics, and Health
Department of Biology
Department of Nursing
Department of Health Sciences
Department of Mathematics and Computer Science
Department of Physical and Environmental Sciences
Department of Social Sciences
Graduate Studies

Facilities
Concord University's campus features numerous buildings and facilities.

The majority of administrative offices, as well as the education, social sciences, languages and literature divisions, are located in Marsh Hall (known as "Admin" on campus). Marsh Hall also features a 48-bell carillon atop the building.
The Science Building, attached to Marsh Hall, houses science laboratories and the natural sciences division. Located on the ground floor of the Science Building is the university's electron microprobe lab. This is West Virginia's only electron microprobe lab.
The Alexander Fine Arts Center, home to the fine arts division, features the Main Auditorium, art galleries, H.C. Paul Theatre, art laboratories, classrooms, and the office of the student newspaper.
The Carter Center houses the university's two gymnasiums, athletic offices, classrooms, racquetball courts, indoor athletic facilities, and the swimming pool.
The Student Center includes a cafeteria, food court, student government office, student support offices, mail office, and public relations offices. The Student Center also features a ballroom and conference facilities.
The Bonner House houses the offices of the Bonner Scholars Program, a conference room, the counseling center, and faculty offices.
The Woodrum House is home to students from the ALEF (Appalachian Leadership and Education Foundation) Fellowship, a leadership organization on campus.
The Maintenance Building houses the public safety offices, receiving station, and maintenance facilities. Witherspoon Park features faculty housing.
The President's House and Vice President's House as well as other homes are located on campus.
The campus features an observatory.
The university has the largest library in southern West Virginia, the J. Frank Marsh Library, which is a depository for federal documents. The library offers computer labs and facilities, microfiche, copying services, a juvenile section, and the university's archives. In the basement of the library, the university has its Center for Academic Technologies, which features a television studio, radio station and studio, a DNA laboratory, as well as distance education and technology classrooms.
Outdoor athletic facilities include Callaghan Stadium featuring an artificial turf field funded by June O. Shott. Callaghan Stadium also features track and field facilities, tennis courts, and a baseball/softball practice field. Anderson Field, located on the outskirts of the campus, features the soccer field and baseball/softball field.
Five main residence halls: The Twin Towers, North (women's) and South (men's), Laura A. Sarvay Hall (closed), Damarius O. Wilson Hall (co-ed), and W.S. "Woody" Wooddell Hall, referred to on-campus as "The Woo" (closed).
The Nick Rahall Technology Center, a state-of-the-art facility. It is the home of the Division of Business, the Entrepreneurial Studies Program, the Center for Academic Technologies, and the university computer center. This $14 million project is a central location for McDowell, Wyoming, Raleigh, Fayette, Greenbrier, Summers, Mercer and Monroe Counties of West Virginia where existing business may obtain training/orientation in technologies. The center also houses the Concord University Entrepreneurial Studies Program, supported by a grant from the Hugh Ike Shott Foundation. Incubator businesses, gifted Concord students, as well as professional Concord consulting faculty from the School of Business and other disciplines, are brought together in the Rahall Center to use the area's "brain trust" to create entrepreneurial advantages for Southern West Virginia.
The University Point facility, housing the Erickson Alumni Center, as well as the Wilkes Family Interfaith Chapel and Museum.

Other campuses

Concord University's main campus is located in Athens, West Virginia. The university also operates in a center near Beckley, Raleigh County. The facility was established to coordinate the public colleges serving the region with five founding institutions. US Senator Robert C. Byrd secured $10 million from the US Department of Health and Human Services to develop the campus and begin building the facility. It is named the Erma Byrd Higher Education Center (after the deceased spouse of senator Byrd) in Beaver. The center was designed to also serve as a catalyst to attract business and industry to the area. Concord University's Beckley office coordinates classes at the Erma Byrd Center as well as at several other facilities in and surrounding Beckley.

Campus organizations
Concord sponsors nearly 200 on-campus organizations, including fraternities, sororities, religious and political organizations, an Art Society, chapters of Delta Zeta, Alpha Sigma Alpha, Sigma Sigma Sigma, Phi Alpha Delta, Alpha Phi Omega, Tau Kappa Epsilon, Phi Sigma Phi, Sigma Tau Delta, Alpha Sigma Tau, Gay-Straight Alliance, College Republicans, Young Democrats, a chapter of Amtgard known as the "Shire of Nowhere Mountains," and a community theatre organization known as the Appalachian Shakespeare Project.

The Concord University Student Government Association (SGA) is responsible for many changes on campus and is active in every aspect of Concord life. All organizations are required to send a representative to all SGA meetings if they would like to ability to vote in the Student Senate and obtain budgetary privileges to request funds from the Student Government's Discretionary fund. The Student Government at Concord University is especially advanced compared to other SGAs in West Virginia, and is noted for its model judicial system wherein a student court, composed entirely of students, handles the majority of adjudications for most student offenses. The Student Government is also one of few student governments in the state of West Virginia that have a voting member on the university's Board of Governors.

Residence life

There are five residence halls on campus. North (Female) and South (Male) Towers house the fraternities and sororities as well as Honors and several sports teams. Each floor has two lounges. There is one co-ed hall, Sarvay, which is also the oldest building on campus still standing. Sarvay is traditionally a female dorm but due to a shortage of housing, males lived on the first floor. The other two halls are Wilson for females and Woodell, nicknamed "The Woo," for males. Housing is not divided by year. Several floors are set aside as "Substance free," and the rest allow alcohol if both residents are over 21.

The North and South Towers complex underwent a major renovation, which was completed in 2017.

As of Fall Semester 2018, the only residence halls open were North Tower, South Tower, and Wilson Hall, due to lack of enrollment.
Wilson Hall now acts as a co-ed hall, with males and females living on separate floors.

Athletics

Concord University, known athletically as the Mountain Lions, is home to many intercollegiate and intramural athletics teams. The men's intercollegiate teams include: baseball, basketball, football, cross country, golf, soccer, tennis as well as track and field. The women's intercollegiate teams include basketball, cheerleading, cross country, golf, soccer, softball, tennis as well as track and field. Concord University is an NCAA Division II school, and a member of the Mountain East Conference. The Office of Student Affairs provides intramurals in many athletic activities, including flag football, volleyball, and basketball.

Notable alumni

 Ronald J. Bacigal, professor of law, University of Richmond School of Law
 Robert Byrd, US Senator from West Virginia
 Don Caruth, West Virginia politician
 Phil Conley, West Virginian historian, author, and teacher
 Creigh Deeds, Virginia state senator
 Alexander Harman, Justice of the Supreme Court of Virginia
 Daniel Harnsberger, professional wrestler better known as Daniel Richards
 Kahlil Joseph, film, television, and stage actor as well as teacher of performing arts
 Christy Martin, world champion female boxer
 Bret Munsey, Arena Football League coach
 Freida J. Riley, teacher who influenced the Rocket Boys, subjects of the movie October Sky
 Jackson L. Kiser, judge of the United States District Court for the Western District of Virginia
 Josh Stowers, member, West Virginia House of Delegates

References

External links

Official website
Official athletics website

 
Buildings and structures in Mercer County, West Virginia
Public universities and colleges in West Virginia
1872 establishments in West Virginia